The FIBA Africa Championship 1985 was hosted by Ivory Coast from December 20 to December 28, 1985.  The games were played in Abidjan.  Ivory Coast won the tournament, its second African Championship, by beating Angola in the final.  Both teams qualified for the 1986 FIBA World Championship as a result of their showing in this tournament.

Competing nations
The following national teams competed:

Preliminary rounds

Group A

Day 1

Day 2

Day 3

Day 4

Day 5

Group B

Day 1

Day 2

Day 3

Day 4

Day 5

Knockout stage

Classification Stage

Final standings

External links
 FIBA Archive

1985 in African basketball
Sport in Abidjan
AfroBasket
B
International sports competitions hosted by Ivory Coast
December 1985 sports events in Africa